Granite Falls can refer to:

United States
Granite Falls, Minnesota
Granite Falls Township, Chippewa County, Minnesota
Granite Falls, North Carolina
Granite Falls, Washington
Granite Falls, Wyoming

Canada
Granite Falls, British Columbia

 Australia
Granite Falls (waterfall), New South Wales
Granite Falls, Tasmania